Neil Roebuck (born 4 October 1969) is an English former professional rugby league footballer who played in the 1980s and 1990s.

Background
Neil Roebuck was born in Hemsworth, West Riding of Yorkshire, England.

Playing career

County Cup Final appearances
Neil Roebuck played as an interchange/substitute, i.e. number 14, (replacing  Terry Holmes) in Bradford Northern's 12-12 draw with Castleford in the 1987 Yorkshire County Cup Final during the 1987–88 season at Headingley Rugby Stadium, Leeds on Saturday 17 October 1987, but he did not play in the 11-2 victory over Castleford in the 1987 Yorkshire County Cup Final replay during the 1987–88 season at Elland Road, Leeds on Saturday 31 October 1987, and played , and scored a drop goal in Castleford's 11-8 victory over Wakefield Trinity in the 1990 Yorkshire County Cup Final during the 1990–91 season at Elland Road, Leeds on Sunday 23 September 1990.

Club career
Neil Roebuck was transferred from Bradford Northern to Castleford on 15 December 1989, and made his début for Castleford in the 18-25 defeat by Leeds on Tuesday 26 December 1989.

References

External links
Player statistics at rugbyleagueproject.org

Bradford Northern - 1987/88 Team Photo
Bradford Northern - 1989/90 Team Photo

1969 births
Living people
Bradford Bulls players
Castleford Tigers players
English rugby league players
Featherstone Rovers players
People from Hemsworth
Rugby league locks
Rugby league players from Wakefield
Sportspeople from Yorkshire